The Housemaid (Hangul: 하녀, Hanja: 下女, Hanyeo) is a 1960 South Korean film, produced, written and directed by Kim Ki-young. It stars Lee Eun-shim, Ju Jeung-nyeo and Kim Jin-kyu. It has been described in Koreanfilm.org as a "consensus pick as one of the top three Korean films of all time". It is the first film in Kim's Housemaid trilogy followed by Woman of Fire and Woman of Fire '82. The film was remade in 2010 by Im Sang-soo.

Plot
The film is a domestic horror, following the story of an upper-middle-class family falling into destruction due to the introduction of a sexually predatory femme fatale housemaid into the household.

The film begins with a scene of a pianist, Mr. Dong-sik Kim, reading a newspaper story to his wife about a man falling in love with his maid.

Mr. Kim works at a factory of primarily female employees, as the piano accompanist for the factory's extracurricular choir group. This was after the Korean War, where economic strife became more prevalent in a time of national division, and so women were sent away to earn more money for their families. Women would often live in these factories, so many extracurricular activities were offered for time outside of work hours. Mr. Kim is incredibly popular among the women at the factory, due to his 'good looks', which entice Kyeung-Hee 'Miss Cho' Cho. Miss Cho pressures her friend to write a letter to Mr. Kim, pouring over how much she is infatuated by him. This ends poorly, as her friend is subsequently fired from the factory. Miss Cho attempts to further pursue Mr. Kim by taking up his offer of piano lessons, which he had proposed to help earn more income during his wife's pregnancy.

Back at the Kim residence, Mr. Kim's wife is heavily pregnant, and the family have just moved into a two-story house with his wife and two children, much larger than their previous residence. Mrs. Kim, also supporting the family as a dressmaker, becomes gradually too exhausted to clean the house, and so Mr. Kim asks Miss Cho if she is able to find a woman from work who would be interested in becoming the Kim's housemaid. Miss Cho later returns with Myung-Sook, a cleaner from the factory. She behaves strangely as their new housemaid, catching rats with her hands, teasing the Kim children, and spying on Mr. Kim while he lays with his wife and gives Miss Cho piano lessons.

Back at the factory, Miss Cho learns that her friend has committed suicide after being fired, due to being overcome by pressure of not being able to secure a new job. In an emotional state, Miss Cho confesses later that day to Mr. Kim during their piano lesson that she was actually the one in love with him, not her friend. Miss Cho then attempts to fling herself at Mr. Kim, who rejects her due to being married to Mrs. Kim. Mrs. Kim is away at her parents during the entire ordeal. In the aftermath, Mr. Kim becomes incredibly stressed, and the housemaid Myung-Sook has watched this entire encounter from afar. Myung-Sook then uses this as her opportunity to make a move, seducing him. In his emotional state, Mr. Kim succumbs to her and the two engage in an affair.

Myung-Sook proceeds to feel ill as the weeks pass, revealing her pregnancy by Mr. Kim. Mr. Kim eventually has to come clean to his wife, and despite her initial depression over being cheated on, she devises a plan which requires Myung-Sook to thrust herself down the flight of stairs which lead to the second storey. As their housemaid, Myung-Sook is forced to agree to this, and it successfully results in her having a miscarriage. After this incident, the housemaid's behavior becomes increasingly erratic. She threatens to kill the composer's newborn son. Mr. Kim fights her off as she tries to grab at the baby. Myung-Sook then offers Mr. Kim's other son water, and tells him that she has poured rat poison into it. As she tells him this, he further panics and falls to his death down a flight of stairs. Myung-Sook later states that it was just normal tap water.

Instead of turning her in to the police, Mrs. Kim offers to support Myung-sook in order to keep her from losing her job, telling Myung-Sook she can have anything she wants; Myung-Sook then asks to have Mr. Kim. She forces him to move upstairs into her room while Mrs. Kim labors over her sewing machine, falling asleep at her work every day. Unable to stand their new arrangement, both the wife and daughter attempt to poison Myung-sook, but she outsmarts them. Finally, Myung-sook persuades Mr. Kim to commit suicide with her by swallowing rat poison on the grounds she will not harm anyone else in his family. He crawls downstairs and dies next to his wife, asking her to "Take good care of the children."

The film ends with the composer reading the story from a newspaper with his wife, returning to the very beginning of the film. The film's narrative has apparently been told by the composer, who then smiles and warns the film audience that this is just the sort of thing that could happen to anyone.

Cast
Kim Jin-kyu as Dong-sik Kim (the husband/father)
Ju Jeung-ryu as Mrs. Kim (the wife/mother)
Lee Eun-shim (이은심, 李恩心) as Myung-sook (the housemaid)
Um Aing-ran as Kyung-hee Cho (the factory worker who takes piano lessons)
Ko Seon-ae as Seon-young Kwak (the factory worker who commits suicide)
Ahn Sung-ki as Chang-soon Kim (the son)
Lee Yoo-ri as Ae-soon Kim (the daughter)
Kang Seok-je
Na Jeong-ok

Reception and legacy
In 2003, Jean-Michel Frodon, editor-in-chief of Cahiers du cinéma, wrote that the discovery of The Housemaid by the West, over 40 years after the film's debut, was a "marvelous feeling—marvelous not just because one finds in writer-director Kim Ki-young a truly extraordinary image maker, but in his film such an utterly unpredictable work".

Comparing the director to Luis Buñuel, Frodon wrote Kim is "capable of probing deep into the human mind, its desires and impulses, while paying sarcastic attention to the details". He called The Housemaid "shocking", noting that "the shocking nature of the film is both disturbing and pleasurable". Frodon pointed out that The Housemaid was only one early major film in the director's career, and that Kim Ki-young would continue "running wild through obsessions and rebellion" with his films for decades to come.

Bong Joon-ho has said The Housemaid was one of the inspirations for his 2019 Academy Award-winning film Parasite.

References

Bibliography

Further reading

External links

Review at asiandb.com
Review at filmbrain.com
Review at Koreanfilm.org
The Housemaid: Crossing Borders an essay by Kyung Hyun Kim at the Criterion Collection

1960 horror films
1960s psychological thriller films
South Korean psychological horror films
1960s Korean-language films
Films directed by Kim Ki-young
Maids in films
1960s psychological horror films
South Korean films based on actual events